A mixed nerve is any nerve that contains both sensory (afferent) and motor (efferent) nerve fibres. All spinal nerves are mixed nerves. Some cranial nerves are mixed nerves.

Examples 

 Spinal nerves
 Suprascapular nerve
 Pudendal nerve
 Obturator nerve
 Femoral nerve
 Sciatic nerve

Cranial nerves 

 Trigeminal nerve (CN V)
 Facial nerve (CN VII)
 Glossopharyngeal nerve (CN IX)
 Vagus nerve (CN X)

References 

Nerves
Spinal nerves
Cranial nerves